Patrick Grigoriu and Costin Pavăl were the defending champions, but they lost in the first round to Egor Gerasimov and Dimitar Kuzmanov 6–1, 6–4 .

Marco Chiudinelli and Frank Moser won the title, defeating Carsten Ball and Dustin Brown in the final 7–6(7–5) , 7–5 .

Seeds

Draw

Draw

References
 Main Draw

Internazionali di Tennis Castel del Monte - Doubles
2015 Doubles
2015 in Italian tennis